The 23rd Filmfare Awards were held on March 30, 1976.

Sholay led the ceremony with 10 nominations, followed by Amanush and Deewaar with 9 nominations each, along with Aandhi and Sanyasi with 7 nominations each.

Deewaar won 7 awards, including Best Film, Best Director (for Yash Chopra) and Best Supporting Actor (for Shashi Kapoor). thus becoming the most-awarded film at the ceremony.

Sholay, considered one of the most successful films of Bollywood, was expected to steam-roll the competition, controversially went home with just 1 win out of its 10 nominations, winning Best Editing (for M. S. Shinde).

Sanjeev Kumar received dual nominations for Best Actor for his performances in Aandhi and Sholay, winning for the former.

Hema Malini received dual nominations for Best Actress for her performances in Khushboo and Sanyasi, but lost to Lakshmi who won the award for Julie, her first and only win in the category.

Pran received dual nominations for Best Supporting Actor for his performances in Do Jhoot and Majboor, but lost to Shashi Kapoor who won the award for Deewaar, his sole acting Filmfare award.

Main Awards

Best Film
 Deewaar 
Aandhi
Amanush
Sanyasi
Sholay

Best Director
 Yash Chopra – Deewaar 
Gulzar – Aandhi
Ramesh Sippy – Sholay
Shakti Samanta – Amanush
Sohanlal Kanwar – Sanyasi

Best Actor
 Sanjeev Kumar – Aandhi 
Amitabh Bachchan – Deewaar
Manoj Kumar – Sanyasi
Sanjeev Kumar – Sholay
Uttam Kumar – Amanush

Best Actress
 Lakshmi – Julie 
Hema Malini – Khushboo
Hema Malini – Sanyasi
Jaya Bachchan – Mili
Suchitra Sen – Aandhi

Best Supporting Actor
 Shashi Kapoor – Deewaar 
Amjad Khan – Sholay
Pran – Do Jhoot
Pran – Majboor
Utpal Dutt – Amanush

Best Supporting Actress
 Nadira – Julie 
Aruna Irani – Do Jhoot
Farida Jalal – Majboor
Nirupa Roy – Deewaar
Prema Narayan – Amanush

Best Comic Actor
 Deven Verma – Chori Mera Kaam 
Asrani – Rafoo Chakkar
Asrani – Sholay
Keshto Mukherjee – Kala Sona
Mehmood – Qaid

Best Story
 Deewaar – Salim–Javed 
Aandhi – Kamleshwar
Amanush – Shakti Prada Rajguru
Nishant – Vijay Tendulkar
Sholay – Salim–Javed

Best Screenplay
 Deewaar – Salim–Javed

Best Dialogue
 Deewaar – Salim–Javed

Best Music Director 
 Julie – Rajesh Roshan 
Dulhan – Laxmikant–Pyarelal
Khel Khel Mein – R.D. Burman
Sanyasi – Shankar–Jaikishan
Sholay – R.D. Burman

Best Lyricist
 Amanush – Indeevar for Dil Aisa Kisi Ne Mera Toda
Aandhi – Gulzar for Tere Bina Zindagi Se
Dulhan – Anand Bakshi for Chitti Zaroor Aayegi
Sanyasi – Visveshwara Sharma for Chal Sanyasi
Sholay – Anand Bakshi for Mehbooba Mehbooba

Best Playback Singer, Male
 Amanush – Kishore Kumar for Dil Aisa Kisi Ne Mera Toda
Faraar – Kishore Kumar for Main Pyaasa Tu Saawan
Khushboo – Kishore Kumar for O Maajhi Re
Sanyasi – Manna Dey for Kya Mar Sakegi
Sholay – R.D. Burman for Mehbooba Mehbooba

Best Playback Singer, Female
Sankalp – Sulakshna Pandit for Tu Hi Sagar Hai
Amanush – Asha Bhosle for Kal Ke Apne
Jai Santoshi Maa – Usha Mangeshkar for Main To Aarti
Julie – Preeti Sagar for My Heart Is Beating
Khel Khel Mein – Asha Bhosle for Sapna Mera Toot Gaya

Best Art Direction
 Do Jhoot  – Bansi Chandragupta

Best Cinematography
 Dharmatma  – Kamal Bose

Best Editing
 Sholay  – M. S. Shinde

Best Sound
 Deewaar  – M. A. Shaikh

Critics' Awards

Best Film
 Aandhi

Best Documentary
 Sarojini Naidu

Special Award
 Preeti Sagar for "My Heart Is Beating" in Julie

Biggest Winners
 Deewaar – 7/9
 Julie – 3/4
 Amanush – 2/9
 Aandhi – 2/7
 Sholay – 1/10

References

https://www.imdb.com/event/ev0000245/1976/

See also
 25th Filmfare Awards
 24th Filmfare Awards
 Filmfare Awards

Filmfare Awards
Filmfare
1976 in Indian cinema